Judgement 6 was a professional wrestling event promoted by DDT Pro-Wrestling (DDT). It took place on March 25, 2002, in Tokyo, Japan, at the Shibuya Club Atom. It was the sixth event under the Judgement name. The event aired domestically on Fighting TV Samurai.

Storylines
Judgement 6 featured six professional wrestling matches that involved different wrestlers from pre-existing scripted feuds and storylines. Wrestlers portrayed villains, heroes, or less distinguishable characters in the scripted events that built tension and culminated in a wrestling match or series of matches.

Event
The dark match was held as a "demo" for the video game Tekken 4 that would be released on console a few days later in Japan. Shoichi Ichimiya wrestled under the name , a parody of Poison Sawada Julie who wrestled in the main event.

Results

References

External links
The official DDT Pro-Wrestling website

6
2002 in professional wrestling
Professional wrestling in Tokyo